Boana rhythmica is a species of frog in the family Hylidae. It is endemic to Venezuela and only known from its type locality, Cerro Jaua in Bolívar State. It occurs along streams on the slopes of the tepui. The tepui is within the Jaua-Sarisariñama National Park, and no major threats to this species have been identified.

References

Boana
Endemic fauna of Venezuela
Amphibians of Venezuela
Frogs of South America
Amphibians described in 2002
Taxa named by Josefa Celsa Señaris
Taxonomy articles created by Polbot
Amphibians of the Tepuis